Kępiński (femine: Kępińska) is a Polish surname meaning 'related to Kępno County'. Notable people with the surname include:

 Antoni Kępiński (1918–1972), Polish psychiatrist and philosopher
 Elżbieta Kępińska (born 1937), Polish film actress
 Józef Kępiński (disambiguation), multiple people
 Lydia Képinski, Québécoise indie pop singer
 Miro Kepinski (born 1980), Polish film composer

Other 
 Kepínski (crater) 
 Powiat kępiński, unit of territorial administration in Greater Poland Voivodeship
 Umowa kępińska, 1282 agreement between Wielkopolska and Pomerania

See also 
 Kempinski (surname)

Polish-language surnames